Alfredo Barba Hernández (born 12 May 1944) is a Mexican politician from the Institutional Revolutionary Party. He has  served as Deputy of the LIII, LV and LX Legislatures of the Mexican Congress representing Jalisco.

References

1944 births
Living people
Politicians from Jalisco
Institutional Revolutionary Party politicians
21st-century Mexican politicians
Deputies of the LX Legislature of Mexico
Members of the Chamber of Deputies (Mexico) for Jalisco